The voiceless palatal lateral fricative is a type of consonantal sound, used in a few spoken languages. 

This sound is somewhat rare; Dahalo has both a palatal lateral fricative and an affricate; Hadza has a series of affricates.

The IPA proper has no dedicated symbol for this sound. The devoicing and raising diacritics may be used to transcribe it: . However, the extIPA has the expected letter :

 was added to Unicode in 2021.

The equivalent X-SAMPA symbols are K_-_j or K_-' and L_0_+_r, respectively. A non-IPA letter  (devoiced and raised  can be used, which is an ordinary "l", plus the curl found in the symbols for alveolo-palatal sibilant fricatives ).

Some scholars also posit the voiceless palatal lateral approximant distinct from the fricative.

Features
Features of the voiceless palatal lateral fricative:

Occurrence

Notes

References

See also
Index of phonetics articles

External links
 

Lateral consonants
Pulmonic consonants
Voiceless oral consonants
Palatal consonants